Kristubhagavatam: A Mahakavya in Sanskrit based on the life of Jesus Christ (or Kristu-Bhāgavatam) is a Sanskrit epic poem on the life of Jesus Christ composed by P. C. Devassia (1906–2006), a Sanskrit scholar and poet from Kerala, India. For composing the Kristubhagavatam, Devassia won several awards, including the Sahitya Akademi Award for Sanskrit (1980).
Composed in 1976 and first published in 1977, the poem consists of 33 cantos and over 1600 verses. Understood as a mahakavya, it represents the most prestigious genre of Sanskrit epic poetry, characterized by ornate and elaborate descriptions.

Contents

The 1977 published version of the Kristubhagavatam contains over 1600 Sanskrit verses divided into 33 cantos, perhaps corresponding to the number of years lived by Jesus. Each Sanskrit verse is accompanied by an English translation. The poem and the translation comprise 434 pages. Titles of selected cantos, in both English and Sanskrit, are listed in the table at right.

The published poem contains a 3-page preface by the author, in which he described the process by which he composed the poem over approximately 5 years. He wrote that "I had to face a difficult problem":
On the one hand, Christ is a historical figure, and I must narrate his life objectively; on the other hand, a Sanskrit Mahakavya must conform to certain norms laid down by Sanskrit rhetoricians. These norms require free play of the imagination. This is often incompatible with objective narrative. I did not fancy the idea of translating the Bible into Sanskrit. I wanted my work to be really a Mahakavya, a literary piece, which anyone conversant with Sanskrit language should be able to read and enjoy. I have taken as my guide Fulton Oursler, who, in his "The Greatest Story Ever Told", tells the story of Christ and fills in the details left out in the gospels by means of his fertile imagination.

The author, a devout Christian, also stated that
I grew up in an atmosphere of Sanskrit literature and I have been dealing with the Sanskrit classics in and outside the classroom either as a student, or a teacher for the last sixty years. Naturally some of that cultural heritage cannot but appear even in a work on Christ. Moreover, I believe our task today is to underscore the similarities and the points in common between different cultures and religions rather than emphasise the differences.

Selected Sanskrit verses, along with the author's English translations, are shown at right.

Reception & commentary
For composing the Kristubhagavatam, Devassia won several awards, including the Sahitya Akademi Award for Sanskrit (1980), the Maharani Sethu Parvati Bayi Prize (1979), and the Catholic Laity Association Award (1981). The published poem also contained commentaries by V. Raghavan (Foreword), K. Kunjunni Raja (Introduction), Joseph Cardinal Parecattil (Appreciation), S. Venkitasubramonia Iyer (Appreciation), M. H. Sastri (Appreciation), K. R. Srinivasa Iyengar (Appreciation), and Charudeva Shastri (Appreciation).

In his foreword, V. Raghavan wrote that the first efforts of the Christian missionaries to produce Christian literature in Sanskrit resulted in "translations of the Bible, which were all miserable." In contrast the Kristubhagavatam is the first major Sanskrit poem on the "whole life of Christ," and Devassia "follows all the norms and practices of the Mahakavya, but does not indulge in too many figures or descriptions.... The style is simple and clear, endowed as it is with the Gunas of 'Prasada' and 'Saukumarya.' Furthermore,
Not only the incidents, the miracles, etc. are faithfully given, but also the famous sayings of Christ... are incorporated in appropriate terms. [There is also] inclusion of apt analogies and comparisons with personalities and situations in the two Sanskrit Epics, the Ramayana and the Mahabharata, as also in the Puranas, and occasionally with some well-known happenings in modern India, like the killing of Gandhiji.... No effort is spent to make the poem over-coloured or loaded with displays of learning or skill: it is always simple and straightforward, in the much valued 'Vaidarbhi'Sanskrit, particularly classical Sanskrit has its own styles, viz: Vaidarbhi and Gaudi. Kālidāsa was a master of Vaidarbhi style. Vaidarbhi style in the dramas of kālidāsa [sic] is easy flowing, chaste and elegant. It is absolutely free from elaborate and laboured constructions. Words are chosen in large numbers from common usage but more words that are absolutely necessary are never used. The style is concise and highly suggestive. the verses are free from long compounds." III. Language variation (accessed 12 Dec, 2010). style.
Raghavan added that in Devassia's state of Kerala, "where Sanskrit and Malayalam have blended into a homogeneous amalagam, the community of Sanskritists is a commonwealth of Hindus, Christians and Muslims.... one finds here an Indian approach and an Indian presentation of the life of Christ."

Mar Joseph Parecattil, Archbishop of Ernakulum and a Catholic cardinal (in the Syro-Malabar Catholic Church, a church in full communion with the Roman Catholic Church), and recent President of the Catholic Bishops' Conference of India, wrote in his Appreciation that...
I have no hesitation in saying that this "magnum opus" of prof. P. C. Devassia will certainly throw open the doors for those Sanyasins and other Sanskrit scholars, who usually do not go in for the life of Christ written in western languages, to have access to Christ in the idioms and expressions of a language with which they are familiar

K. R. Srinivasa Iyengar wrote that "The Gospel-story is retained in essentials, but...
...the sonority of Sanskrit gives a fresh morning splendour and resonance to Jesus' divine ministry. Mary held Joseph's hand as Arundhati did Vasishtha's; Just as Vasudeva hid his son Krishna in Nanda's house, so did Joseph take Jesus to Egypt for his safety; Lazarus' sisters embraced him as he emerged out of his tomb, even as Devayani embraced Kacha as he revived after death.... in betraying Jesus with a kiss, wasn't Judas anticipating Godse who was to kill the Mahatma after first saluting him? The similes come naturally, and rather bring out the basic unity of texture that binds all human history.

In summary, K. R. Srinivasa Iyengar concluded that the Kristubhagavatam is...
...a double demonstration, firstly that Sanskrit is by no means a 'dead language' but is very much and gloriously alive; and secondly, that Jesus is not the Christians' Messiah alone, but one of the pathfinders, one of the redeemers, of humanity as a whole. His message of Love has a permanent and potent significance for all mankind.

Editions
 ASIN B0000D6PEI

See also
Christianity in Kerala
Religious pluralism
Sanskrit revival

References

External links

Kristubhagavatam at Internet Archive (downloadable)

1976 poems
1977 books
Christian poetry
Sanskrit texts
Epic poems in Sanskrit
Sahitya Akademi Award-winning works